Żelazko  is a village in the administrative district of Gmina Ogrodzieniec, within Zawiercie County, Silesian Voivodeship, in southern Poland. It lies approximately seven km southeast of Ogrodzieniec, 15 km southeast of Zawiercie, and 43 km northeast of the regional capital Katowice.

References

Villages in Zawiercie County